The FIU Panthers football statistical leaders are individual statistical leaders of the FIU Panthers football program in various categories, including passing, rushing, receiving, total offense, defensive stats, and kicking. Within those areas, the lists identify single-game, single-season, and career leaders. The Panthers represent Florida International University in the NCAA's Conference USA.

FIU began competing in intercollegiate football in 2002, so the typical issues with school records do not exist. There is no period of the late 19th and early 20th century with spotty, incomplete records. Therefore, Bulls' records are also not affected by the lengthening of the season to 12 games over the years, the 1972 NCAA decision to allow freshmen to play varsity football, or the 2002 NCAA decision to count bowl games in players' official statistics.

These lists are updated through the end of the 2016 season.

Passing

Passing yards

Passing touchdowns

Rushing

Rushing yards

Rushing touchdowns

Receiving

Receptions

Receiving yards

Receiving touchdowns

Total offense
Total offense is the sum of passing and rushing statistics. It does not include receiving or returns.

Total offense yards

Touchdowns responsible for
"Touchdowns responsible for" is the NCAA's official term for combined passing and rushing touchdowns.

Defense

Interceptions

Tackles

Sacks

Kicking

Field goals made

Field goal percentage

References

Lists of college football statistical leaders by team